Stenogastrura is a genus of springtails in the family Hypogastruridae. There is at least one described species in Stenogastrura, S. hiemalis.

References

Further reading

 
 
 

Collembola